Travels with Darley is a PBS and Amazon Prime travel television series. The show is hosted by American Darley Newman and documents Newman's experiences with locals around the world. It premiered on PBS in 2016, taking audiences to Europe, the Caribbean and the United States. It can also be viewed on demand on Amazon Prime and has appeared on international broadcast networks as well as on over 2,000 partner sites such as MSN and HuffPost. Since its debut, the program has aired 36-half hour episodes over the span of six seasons and is currently shooting its seventh season.

Episodes

Season 1 (2016)

Season 2 (2016)

Season 3 (2017)

Season 4 (2017)

Season 5 (2018)

Season 6 (2019)

Notable guests and places
Chef Sang-Hoon Diegiembre - In Season 1's "Belgium: Castles, Cities & Countryside" episode, Newman cooks and dines with Chef Sang-Hoon Diegiembre at the two-star Michelin restaurant, L'air du temps in Éghezée, Belgium.
Chef Matthew McClure - In Season 1's "Southern States Road Trip" episode, Newman cooks and dines with Chef Matthew McClure, a semifinalist for “Best Chef: South” in the James Beard Foundation Awards, at The Hive at The 21c Museum Hotel in Bentonville, Arkansas.
Gareth Wyn Jones - In Season 2's "Wales: Isles of Anglesey & The Coast" episode, Newman interviews Gareth Wyn Jones, a sheep farmer turned celebrity due to his social media and advocacy work in Conwy, Wales.
Chef Guy Ferdinand/"Chef Hot Pants" - In Season 3's "Martinique Adventures" episode, Newman cooks and dines with Chef Guy Ferdinand, also known as "Chef Hot Pants," at Le Petibonum, a seafood restaurant located on a black sand beach in Le Carbet, Martinique.
Chef Mango Tsang Chiu Lit - In Season 3's "Hong Kong Urban Adventures," Newman cooks and dines with Chef Mango Tsang Chiu Lit at Michelin-star restaurant, Ming Court at the Cordis Hotel in Hong Kong.
Ottawa Mayor Robert M. Eschbach - In Season 3's "Illinois: Ottawa & Beyond" episode, Newman goes on a biking tour of the city of Ottawa, Illinois with Mayor Robert M. Eschbach.
Restaurateur Florence Jaramillo - In Season 5's "Santa Fe Adventures" episode, Newman eats with Restaurateur Florence Jamillo at Jamillo's restaurant, Rancho de Chimayó Restaurante, a James Beard Foundation Award-winning establishment for American Classic in Chimayó, New Mexico.
Clay S. Jenkinson - In Season 6's "North Dakota" episode, Newman goes hiking in Theodore Roosevelt National Park with Clay Jenkinson, American humanities scholar, author, and educator from North Dakota known for The Thomas Jefferson Hour.

Notable events

February 22, 2016: Travels with Darley Viewing Party at The Cotton Gin in Five Points, Columbia, South Carolina - The Columbia Convention and Visitors Bureau (CVB) and Amy Beth Franks with the Five Points Association invited locals to view an advanced screening of Season 1's "Road Trip: Maryland, Virginia and South Carolina" episode and the chance to meet host Newman. Columbia Mayor Stephen K. Benjamin was in attendance.
February 23, 2017: Travels with Darley in Martinique Preview Party at the Embassy of France in Washington, D.C. - The Martinique Tourism Authority invited nearly 200 attendees to get an exclusive behind-the-scenes look of the show's filming for Season 3's "Martinique Adventures" episode. Presenters included host Newman, First Counselor of the French Embassy Patrick Lachaussée, General Director of the Martinique Tourism Authority Joëlle Desir, Martinique-based Chef Guy Ferdinand/"Chef Hot Pants," and French Embassy Chef Daniel Labone.
April 1, 2017: Travels with Darley Screening and Q&A event at The Mar Theatre in Wilmington, Illinois - Organized by Veronica Hinke of the Midewin National Tallgrass Prairie, over 100 people attended this event to get an inside look of both of Season 3's "Route 66: Illinois & Midewin" and "Illinois: Ottawa & Beyond" episodes. Newman was unable to attend but Midewin Archaeologist Joe Wheeler moderated a stand-up Q&A panel featuring locals involved in the production.
April 9, 2017: Travels with Darley Screening and Q&A Event at Roxy Cinemas in Ottawa, Illinois - The Ottawa CVB and the Heritage Corridor CVB invited guests to watch both of Season 3's "Route 66: Illinois & Midewin" and "Illinois: Ottawa & Beyond" episodes. The Q&A panel was led by Heritage Corridor CVB President and CEO Robert Navarro which included host Newman, Ottawa Mayor Robert M. Eschbach, and Ottawa Visitors Center Executive Director Curt Bedei who also helped organize the event.
April 11, 2017: Travels with Darley Screening and Q&A Event at the Joliet Area Historical Museum in Joliet, Illinois - This was the third and final Illinois event which invited the public to view both of Season 3's "Illinois Route 66 & Midewin" and "Illinois: Ottawa & Beyond" episodes. After the screening, Executive Director of the Joliet Area Historical Museum Greg Peerbolte held a Q&A with host Newman, her production team, and locals featured on the episodes. Notable guests included Joliet Mayor Bob O'Dekirk and National Forest Foundation Executive Vice President Mary Mitsos.
September 14, 2017: Tokyo Revealed: PBS Preview with Darley Newman at the Smithsonian in Washington, D.C. - Smithsonian Associates hosted a special premiere party for Travels with Darley Season 4's "Tokyo, Japan" episode held inside the S. Dillon Ripley Center. Host Newman presented attendees with behind-the-scenes clips and insider tips from her trip. Guests were treated to an evening of saké tasting following the screening.
November 14, 2018: Travels in France with Darley Newman: The Best Beyond Paris at the Smithsonian in Washington, D.C. - Smithsonian Associates hosted an exclusive screening for Travels with Darley Season 6's "Brittany, France" episode held inside the S. Dillon Ripley Center. Host Newman spoke before a sold-out crowd providing insight on her experience filming in Brittany and showing extended footage beyond the episode. There was a reception with French wine and appetizers immediately after the program.

Awards and nominations
2018: Caribbean Travel Media Award for Best Broadcast Feature in the Golden Mic category for the "Travels with Darley Martinique" episode of Travels with Darley at the Caribbean Tourism Industry Awards and Fashion Show in New York City

References

External links 
Official website
DCN Creative, LLC

Travels with Darley on Amazon Prime

PBS original programming
American travel television series
2010s American documentary television series
2016 American television series debuts
Television shows filmed in Guadeloupe
Television shows filmed in Maryland
Television shows filmed in Belgium
Television shows filmed in Kentucky
Television shows filmed in Virginia
Television shows filmed in South Carolina
Television shows filmed in the United Kingdom
Television shows filmed in Arkansas
Television shows filmed in Hong Kong
Television shows filmed in Martinique
Television shows filmed in Wyoming
Television shows filmed in Illinois
Television shows filmed in France
Television shows filmed in Missouri
Television shows filmed in Japan
Television shows filmed in New York City
Television shows filmed in New Mexico
Television shows filmed in North Dakota
Television shows filmed in California
Television shows filmed in Alabama